Amblypneustes ovum is a species of sea urchin of the family Temnopleuridae. Their armour is covered with spines. It came from the genus Amblypneustes and lives in the sea. Amblypneustes ovum was first scientifically described in 1816 by Jean-Baptiste de Lamarck.

See also 
Amblypneustes grandis
Amblypneustes leucoglobus
Amblypneustes elevatus

References 

Amblypneustes
Animals described in 1811
Taxa named by Jean-Baptiste Lamarck